Žvab is a small settlement in the Municipality of Ormož in northeastern Slovenia. The area belongs to the traditional region of Styria. It is now included in the Drava Statistical Region.

References

External links
Žvab on Geopedia

Populated places in the Municipality of Ormož